Felimare aurantimaculata is a species of sea slug or dorid nudibranch, a marine gastropod mollusc in the family Chromodorididae.

Distribution 

Description
Felimare aurantimaculata is similar to some specimens of Felimare picta. It is dark blue in colour with slightly raised round orange spots all over the mantle and foot. At the edge of the mantle a series of white glands are visible as raised swellings.

References

Chromodorididae
Gastropods described in 2017